Eduardo Blanco Acevedo (14 March 1884, Montevideo – 7 July 1971) was a Uruguayan political figure and physician.

Background
Son of Juan Carlos Blanco Fernández and Luisa Acevedo, his family was full of prominent personalities in the academic and political fields.

He was a distinguished Uruguayan political figure. He was long associated with the Colorado Party (Uruguay) party. He was father-in-law to President of Uruguay Gabriel Terra.

Political roles

He served in the 1930s as President Gabriel Terra's public health minister.

He served as a Senator in the 1930s and 1940s. He served as the President of the Senate of Uruguay in 1950.

In the 1950s he served as minister for public instruction. From 1952 till 1955 he served at the Consejo Nacional de Gobierno.

Death

He died in 1971.

References

 :es:Eduardo Blanco Acevedo

1884 births
1971 deaths
Politicians from Montevideo
Uruguayan people of Spanish descent
Colorado Party (Uruguay) politicians
National Council of Government (Uruguay)
Education and Culture Ministers of Uruguay
Ministers for Public Health of Uruguay
Ministers of Labor and Social Affairs of Uruguay
Presidents of the Senate of Uruguay
Members of the Senate of Uruguay (1934–1938)
Members of the Senate of Uruguay (1947–1951)
Members of the Senate of Uruguay (1955–1959)
Candidates for President of Uruguay
20th-century Uruguayan physicians
Academic staff of the University of the Republic (Uruguay)